Pukka sahib is a slang term taken from Hindi words for "absolute" ("first class," "absolutely genuine" for English users) and "master," but meaning "true gentleman" or "excellent fellow." The expression was used in the British Empire to describe Europeans or to describe an attitude which British administrators were said to affect, that of an "aloof, impartial, incorruptible arbiter of the political fate of a large part of the earth's surface."

The word "pukka" is still used informally in 21st-century Britain to describe something as excellent.

Occurrence in literature
The term is frequently referenced in E. M. Forster's A Passage to India, and in Agatha Christie's Hercule Poirot series as well as in Why Didn't They Ask Evans?. In his anti-Empire novel Burmese Days, George Orwell refers to it as a "pose," and one of his characters talks of the difficulty that goes into maintaining it. Alexandra Fuller also uses the term in her book Cocktail Hour Under the Tree of Forgetfulness. In the 1938 film, The Young in Heart, Roland Young's character Col. Anthony Carleton, assumes the title to enable his career as a card sharp and con man.  Flowering Wilderness by John Galsworthy also refers to pukka sahibs. In Nevil Shute’s “The Chequer Board”, the term is used in the manner of a backhanded compliment by those wanting Burmese independence from the British - “They’ve spent the last two years getting rid of all the pukka sahibs from the civil service as quick as they could, and then they came along and wanted me to join it. They sort of count me as a Burman now, I think.”

See also
Sahib

References

British English idioms
Indian slang
Pakistani slang
Indian English idioms